The Leesburg Stockade was an event in the civil rights movement in which a group of African-American teenage and pre-teen girls were arrested for protesting racial segregation in Americus, Georgia, and were imprisoned without charges for 45 days in poor conditions in the Lee County Public Works building, in Leesburg, Georgia. The building was then called the Leesburg Stockade, and gave its name to the event. The young prisoners became known as the Stolen Girls.

Background
In July, 1963, the Student Nonviolent Coordinating Committee (the SNCC), in cooperation with the National Association for the Advancement of Colored People,  organized a protest march in Americus from the Friendship Baptist Church to a segregated movie theater. As part of the protest, a group of young women joined the line to attempt to purchase tickets at the movie theater, and were arrested for doing so. After being held briefly in Dawson, Georgia, the protesters were moved to the Leesburg Stockade. Estimates of the number of young women who were held there range from 15 to about 30
or as many as 33.

Imprisonment
Some of the prisoners were as young as 12.
Conditions in the stockade were poor: the prisoners had only concrete floors to sleep on, water only in drips from a shower, a single non-functional toilet, and poor food. The prison authorities did not inform the parents of the prisoners of their arrest or location, and they only found out through the help of a janitor.
The young women were threatened with murder, and at one point a rattlesnake was thrown into their cell.
After the SNCC and Senator Harrison A. Williams used a set of photos by Danny Lyon to publicize the situation, the young women were released, and did not face any criminal charges, but were nevertheless charged a fee for their use of the facilities.

Recognition
Two of the Leesburg Stockade women, Carol Barner Seay and Sandra Russel Mansfield, were added to the Hall of Fame of the National Voting Rights Museum in 2007. The National Museum of African American History and Culture of the Smithsonian Institution publicized the story of the stolen girls in 2016, and they were recognized by a resolution of the Georgia state legislature. On Friday, September 27, 2019 the Georgia Historical Society erected a Historical Marker at the stockade as part of their Civil Rights Trail. Colby Pines managed the Historical Marker application and installation process, and the marker was sponsored by the Lee County High School AP English Program, the Lee County High School Beta Club, and First Monumental Faith Ministries.

Girls of the stockade 
The arrested girls included:

 Carol Barner Seay 
 Lorena Barnum 
 Gloria Breedlove
 Pearl Brown 
 Bobbie Jean Butts 
 Agnes Carter 
 Pattie Jean Colier 
 Mattie Crittenden 
 Barbara Jean Daniels 
 Gloria Dean 
 Carolyn Deloatch 
 Diane Dorsey 
 Juanita Freeman 
 Robertiena Freeman 
 Henrietta Fuller 
 Shirley Ann Green
 Verna Hollis
 Evette Hose 
 Mary Frances Jackson 
 Vyrtis Jackson
 Dorothy Jones 
 Emma Jean Jones 
 Melinda Jones- Williams 
 Emmarene Kaigler 
 Barbara Ann Peterson
 Annie Lue Ragans
 Judith Reid 
 Laura Ruff 
 Sandra Russell
 Willie Mae Smith 
 Eliza Thomas 
 Billie Jo Thornton 
 Lulu M. Westbrook 
 Ozeliar Whitehead 
 Carrie Mae Williams

References

Civil rights movement
African-American history of Georgia (U.S. state)
Prisons in Georgia (U.S. state)
Student Nonviolent Coordinating Committee
Terrell County, Georgia
NAACP
1963 protests
1963 in Georgia (U.S. state)
History of racism in Georgia (U.S. state)